Ratboř is a municipality and village in Kolín District in the Central Bohemian Region of the Czech Republic. It has about 600 inhabitants.

Administrative parts
Villages of Sedlov and Těšínky are administrative parts of Ratboř.

Notable people
Alfons von Czibulka (1888–1969), Czech-Austrian writer and painter

References

Villages in Kolín District